The Uzan, is a left tributary of the Luy de Béarn, in Uzan, Pyrénées-Atlantiques, in Southwestern France.

It rises in the moor of Pont-Long in the north of Pau. It flows into the Luy de Béarn downstream from the Aïgue Longue.

References

Rivers of France
Rivers of Pyrénées-Atlantiques
Rivers of Nouvelle-Aquitaine